The Conquering Sword of Conan is the third of a three-volume set collecting the Conan the Barbarian stories by author Robert E. Howard. It was originally published in 2005, first in the United States by Ballantine/Del Rey under the present title and thereafter in 2009 by Wandering Star Books in the United Kingdom under the title Conan of Cimmeria: Volume Three (1935–1936). The Science Fiction Book Club subsequently reprinted the complete set in hardcover. The set presents the original, unedited versions of Howard's Conan tales. This volume includes short stories as well as such miscellanea as drafts, notes, and maps, and is illustrated by Greg Manchess.

Short stories
"The Servants of Bit-Yakin" (also published as "Jewels of Gwahlur")
"Beyond the Black River"
"The Black Stranger"
"Man-Eaters of Zamboula" (also published as "Shadows in Zamboula")
"Red Nails"

Miscellaneous
Untitled Notes
"Wolves Beyond the Border", Draft A
"Wolves Beyond the Border", Draft B
"The Black Stranger", Synopsis A
"The Black Stranger", Synopsis B
"Man-Eaters of Zamboula", Synopsis
"Red Nails" Draft

Ephemera
Letter to P. Schuyler Miller
Map of the Hyborian Age

Appendices
Hyborian Genesis Part III (by Patrice Louinet)
Notes on the Conan Typescripts and the Chronology (by Patrice Louinet)
Notes on the Original Howard Texts (by Patrice Louinet)

See also

Conan the Barbarian
Robert E. Howard

Conan the Barbarian books by Robert E. Howard
American fantasy novels
2005 short story collections
Del Rey books